Dema or DEMA may refer to:

Acronyms
Association for Democracy Assistance and Human Rights, a Czech organization
Danish Emergency Management Agency (Danish: Det samlede Redningsberedskab), a Danish governmental agency under the Ministry of Defence
Detroit Electronic Music Archive
Malaysia Youth and Students Democratic Movement
Differential Electromagnetic Analysis, a method for obtaining information from computer chips
Diving Equipment and Marketing Association, a nonprofit mutual benefit corporation incorporated in California, USA
Double Exponential Smoothing (D-EMA), a variation of exponential smoothing

People
Dorji Dema (born 1983), athlete from Bhutan who competes in archery
Gjergji Dëma (born 1971), Albanian footballer
Marjan Dema (born 1957), Professor of Mathematics and Rector of the University of Pristina
Dema Kovalenko (born 1977), Ukrainian-American footballer
Ademar Fonseca (commonly known as Dema, 1963–2017), Brazilian football manager
Dema (footballer) (born 1983), William de Mattia, Brazilian football midfielder

Places
Dema, Kentucky, United States
N'Déma, a town and sub-prefecture in the Faranah Region of Guinea
Déma, Benin

Other uses
Dema Deity, an anthropological classification of foundational culture deities
Dema language, a Bantu language of Mozambique
Dema, a fictional location in the lore of Twenty One Pilots

See also
Demas, an associate of the Apostle Paul in the New Testament
Demas Range, Marie Byrd Land, Antarctica

Dzongkha-language surnames
Surnames of Bhutanese origin